Northeastern Europe may refer to:

 the Baltic region
 a part of Europe centered on Finland including neighboring territories
 Northwest Russia

See also